The Zora Neale Hurston National Museum of Fine Arts, also known as The Hurston, is an art museum in Eatonville, Florida. The Hurston is named after Zora Neale Hurston, an African-American writer, folklorist, and anthropologist who moved to Eatonville at a young age and whose father became mayor of Eatonville in 1897. The museum's exhibits are centered on individuals of African descent, from the diaspora and the United States. The Hurston features exhibitions quarterly to highlight emerging artists. 

The museum supports the art involved within the museum and the Zora Neale Hurston Trail, which contains 16 historic artists and 10 markers written by Hurston. The museum is also featured in the Zora Festival, which is held every year to celebrate the history, culture, and arts of Eatonville. In January 2022, the Southern Poverty Law Center gave a $50,000 grant to the museum.

Overview
Established in 1990, the museum shows artworks of African-American artists and other artists from the African Diaspora. The Hurston is sponsored by the Association to Preserve the Eatonville Community, Inc. (P.E.C.), which continues the history and culture of Eatonville. It has developed partnerships with the Orlando Museum of Fine Arts and the Cornell Fine Arts Museum program at Rollins College.

Association to Preserve the Eatonville Community, Inc. (P.E.C.) 
The Association to Preserve the Eatonville Community, abbreviated, P.E.C., stands for pride of heritage, educational excellence, and cultural arts. It is an organization to continuously improve the city of Eatonville and expand the knowledge to create Eatonville to be a tourism destination. Their mission is:

 "To enhance the resources of Eatonville, FL, 'the oldest incorporated African-American municipality in the United States' and the hometown of writer, folklorist, and anthropologist Zora Neale Hurston"
 "To educate the public about Eatonville's historic and cultural significance"
 "To use the community's heritage and cultural vibrancy for its economic development"

The P.E.C. is involved in the education, health, heritage, history, and economic development of Eatonville. Programs like the Zora Festival, ZORA! STEMinitiative, E-WE Lab, and the Yards and Gardens Club are created by the P.E.C. for the continuing knowledge involved in Eatonville. Partners like National Center for Simulation, Valencia Community College, Orlando Science Center, UCF College of Medicine, UCF College of Arts and Humanities, Orange County Public School, and more are involved in these programs.

References

External links
Official website

2011 establishments in Florida
African-American museums in Florida
Art museums and galleries in Florida
Art museums established in 2011
Museums in Orange County, Florida
Year of establishment missing
Zora Neale Hurston